Julie Lynne Hayek (born October 4, 1960) is an American actress, model, charity worker and beauty queen who won Miss USA 1983.

Early life
Hayek is of Czech and German descent on her father's side and Norwegian, Scottish, Irish, and English on her mother's side. Her father was an airline pilot and her mother a high school guidance counselor. She graduated from UCLA a year after holding the Miss USA title, with a bachelor's degree in biology and a minor in psychology.

While cheerleading at UCLA, she was discovered.  After shooting a poster for 20th Century Fox, she was asked to do a screen test by  Paramount Studios head of casting Rueben Cannon, and was subsequently featured in an NBC Nightly News story.  She was prominently featured in a Sports Illustrated article about the UCLA cheerleading squad, Eight Beauties and a Beat.

Miss USA
Hayek won the 1983 Miss California USA title. She represented California in the 1983 Miss USA pageant held in Knoxville, Tennessee, in May 1983, and became her state's fourth Miss USA titleholder.  In her role, she met presidents, prime ministers and heads of state from around the world.  Hayek joined forces with Bob Hope and the USO in support of the nation's servicemen and women.  She was a celebrity guest and entertainer for Bob Hope's USO Christmas in Beirut TV special, shot in Beirut, Lebanon, aboard the Sixth Fleet's aircraft carrier.

Miss Universe
Hayek went on to represent the United States at the 1983 Miss Universe pageant, held at Kiel Auditorium in St. Louis, Missouri. She had the highest preliminary score and won both the swimsuit and evening gown competitions during the final competition. She became first runner-up to eventual winner Lorraine Downes of New Zealand.

Life after Miss USA
As an actress, Hayek has appeared on the TV series Dallas, Twin Peaks, Moonlighting, Matlock, Hunter, Hardball and As the World Turns. She was a celebrity guest on The Tonight Show with Johnny Carson, and co-hosted the 1985 revival of Break the Bank. Her film credits include Commando, along with the made-for-TV movies Scandal in a Small Town and Seduction: Three Tales from the Inner Sanctum.

Hayek later moved to New York to become a model and stock trader. She has modeled or served as spokesperson for Kodak, Victoria's Secret, Christian Dior, Warnaco, Natori, Mary McFadden, Tissot watches, and Mattel.  Hayek has been featured in Vogue, Cosmopolitan, Sports Illustrated (four times), Tattler, Health and Fitness, and Hamptons, and was on the cover of Manhattan magazine.  At the Miss USA 2011 competition, she was among 31 former winners who were part of a photo shoot layout for Time.

Hayek is a real estate agent and is writing a book on health and fitness.  In addition to her professional work, Hayek supports several charities.  She is dedicated to helping animals and people and is currently an active volunteer at the ASPCA.

Filmography

References

External links

Official site of Julie Hayek

1960 births
American cheerleaders
American game show hosts
American people of Czech descent
American people of English descent
American people of German descent
American people of Irish descent
American people of Norwegian descent
American people of Scottish descent
American real estate brokers
Female models from California
Game show models
Living people
Miss Universe 1983 contestants
Miss USA winners
Place of birth missing (living people)
University of California, Los Angeles alumni
21st-century American women